Super Dodge Ball is a dodgeball-based  sports game produced by Technos Japan Corp. originally released as an arcade game in 1987. In Japan, it was the second game starring Technos Japan's video game character Kunio-kun, following Nekketsu Kōha Kunio-kun (the Japanese version of Renegade), although the connection between the two games was removed in the western release. Various home versions and sequels of the game have been released for various platforms.

Gameplay

The player's team is composed of seven members; the team's captain (a large-sized character) and six smaller-sized characters. The captain and three of the other members are constrained to one side of the main court, while the other three stand at the sidelines surrounding the competing team. The objective of the game is to eliminate the members of the opposing team on the other side of the court by throwing the ball against them. Players who are eliminated are turned into a caricature of an angel that flies away to the top of the screen. The team that remains with at least one surviving member wins. If time runs out during a match, then the team with most surviving members wins. The player's life bar represents the number of remaining members, as each character is usually eliminated after taking three or four shots.

The game has two button configuration that change functions depending on the current circumstance. If the player currently has possession of the ball, then the left button will be used for throwing the ball against an opponent, while the right button is used for passing the ball to a nearby teammate. Likewise, if an opponent has possession of the ball, then the left button is used to catch or intercept an opponent's throw, while the right button is to duck an attack. Pressing both buttons simultaneously will cause the player to jump. The player can also dash by pushing the joystick left or right twice, increasing the momentum of an offensive throw. The team's captain has a specialized offensive throw, also known as a "Power Shot", that travels faster and does more damage than a regular offensive throw.

The game begins with a match between Dallas and Chicago to determine who will represent the United States in a worldwide dodge ball tournament. In the single-player game, the player will control Dallas, while the computer controls Chicago. If played against a second player, then the first player controls Dallas and the second controls Chicago. The winning team will then compete in the world cup and face against the following regions: England, Iceland, China, Africa (Kenya in later versions) and Japan. The foreign teams have more than four team members playing offense, although only four show up on the main court. If an opposing team loses a member, they will call upon one of their backups to replace the fallen teammate. After defeating Japan, the player's team is awarded with the world cup by a ninja and the game begins a new cycle starting with England.

Regional differences
The Japanese version was released as a spin-off of Nekketsu Kōha Kunio-kun, the Japanese version of Renegade. The Japanese version features an opening sequence which parodies the pre-stage introductions of Kunio-kun which depicts Kunio being struck by a dodge ball thrown by a passing thug and his teammates chasing after said thug. The American teams of Dallas and Chicago were originally the Japanese teams of Nekketsu High School and Hanazono High School, while the final match was actually against U.S. team themselves. The characters' skin tones and hair colors were changed accordingly in the Western version to reflect this. The character who awards the trophy to the player's team at the end of the game is a thinly-disguised parody of the comic book superhero Superman.

Related games

Ports
A Nintendo Entertainment System version of Super Dodge Ball was released in 1989, although it is not an exact port, as it featured several differences such as special moves and full stats for individual team members, two additional teams (India and U.S.S.R.), and a "Bean Ball" mode. The soundtrack featured stage music appropriate for each country depicted in the game. For example, the Japan stage theme was "Sakura Sakura" and the England stage featured a song apparently written by marrying two Beatles hits ("Get Back" and "A Hard Day's Night").

The Japan-only X68000 version, an exact port of the arcade release, was released on September 1988. It added stereo music and parallax scrolling, as well as a cheat code that increases the character variations.

Another home version was released exclusively in Japan for the PC Engine titled , released on March 30, 1990. It was published by Naxat Soft and developed by KID. Similar to the NES version, the PC Engine version added individual stats, life gauges, and power shots for each member of every team. However, the graphics, teams, and stages are still identical. In addition to the single-player tournament mode and a 2-player versus mode, it also features a single-player quest mode where the player can replace the default members of their team with the captains from the rival teams.

The PlayStation 2 version, released in Japan on January 26, 2006, was published by Hamster as part of the Ore-tachi no Gēsen Zoku series. It is an emulation of the original arcade game.

Sequels
Sequels to Super Dodge Ball have been released for various platforms. A Japan-exclusive Game Boy sequel, titled , was released on August 8, 1991. Another Japanese sequel, titled , was released for the Super Famicom on August 6, 1993. A Neo Geo sequel, simply titled Super Dodge Ball, was released in 1996 and co-published with SNK. It was the final game produced by Technos before they went out of business and as a result, no home version was released and the arcade version was produced in limited quantities.

Years after Technos went out of business, a new company called Million (composed of former staff members of Technos) developed Super Dodge Ball Advance for the Game Boy Advance in 2001. While not an official Kunio-kun game in Japan, it features play mechanics similar to the console installments and some of the same background music as the Kunio-kun series. An official sequel was released by Arc System Works and Aksys Games for the Nintendo DS titled Super Dodgeball Brawlers in 2008.

Although not an official part of the series, Miracle Kidz (a developing team composed of former Technos Japan staff members) released River City Dodgeball All-Stars!! as a doujin game for the PC in 2007. An Xbox 360 version was released in 2009 titled Downtown Smash Dodgeball. Miracle Kidz released the Wii version titled , on July 12, 2011 as a WiiWare title. Unlike their previous Dodgeball games, this installment is officially sanctioned by Million.

Reception 
In Japan, Game Machine listed Super Dodge Ball on their January 1, 1988 issue as being the second most-successful table arcade unit of the month.
The game sold more than 500,000 copies by October 1989.

Notes

References

External links

Hamster page (Japanese)
 
Super Dodge Ball at Arcade Archives Page (Japanese)

1987 video games
Arc System Works franchises
Arcade video games
Dodgeball video games
High school-themed video games
Kunio-kun
X68000 games
TurboGrafx-16 games
PlayStation 2 games
Video games developed in Japan
Video games scored by Hirotoshi Suzuki
Video games set in Dallas
Virtual Console games
Multiplayer and single-player video games